The MoMA Eve was a handheld gaming console presented by Via at E3 2004. It was supposed to play PC games as well as games designed for it. The player would have had to purchase a SIM Card to play purchased games on it. The buttons look like the buttons on an average video game controller with a D-pad on the left, four action buttons on the right, one Start button in the middle, and two analog sticks. It had a 533 MHz processor, a 20GB hard drive for games and movies, Wi-Fi, and a CF slot. It also had TV-OUT. The console encountered a trademark issue in mid-2004. The system was never released and is considered vaporware.

Hardware 
The system used a 533-MHz Eden-N CPU, with an FSB operating at 133-MHz.
This operated in conjunction with a 200-MHz S3 Graphics UniChrome Pro Integrated Graphics Processor and 128MB of DDR266 SDRAM. A 1.8" 20GB Hard drive capable of 133MB/s was used for storage.

The system used VIA Vinyl Audio, supporting six channels. The system had a 1/8" jack for Headphones and one 1/8 jack for Microphone. The system also had a 1/8" TV out jack. The system included 2 USB 2.0 Type A ports The system was powered by two Prismatic Lithium-ion batteries with two slots in the console, and were hot swappable.

External links
 ExtremeTech
 Official VIA site. (Archived)

References

Vaporware game consoles
Handheld game consoles
VIA Technologies
Seventh-generation video game consoles
X86-based game consoles